"Juicy Wiggle" is a song by American singer, dancer, DJ and rapper Redfoo, also known for being half of the duo LMFAO. It was released as the second single from his debut studio album Party Rock Mansion on February 10, 2015. The song was written and produced by Redfoo.

Music video
The music video for this song was released on March 16, 2015, via Redfoo's YouTube account.

Munk Remix
Redfoo recorded a "Munk Remix" of the song featuring Alvin and the Chipmunks for the 2015 film Alvin and the Chipmunks: The Road Chip and its soundtrack.

Iowa State Athletics
Juicy Wiggle has become a tradition at Iowa State football and basketball events. The song will typically be played after a big moment in the game has occurred. The song usually corresponds with a synchronized dance performed by the crowd. The optimal time to hear this song is during the third quarter when Iowa State extends or takes the lead. Unique to Iowa State, this song is not played at any other university and often baffles visiting opponents.

Charts

References

2015 singles
Redfoo songs
Interscope Records singles
Songs written by Redfoo
2015 songs